Xanthorhoe quadrifasiata, the large twin-spot carpet, is a moth of the family Geometridae. It is found in most of Europe (except Portugal, Ireland, Iceland and Greece), east to the Near East and the eastern part of the Palearctic realm.

The wingspan is 29–32 mm. Adults are on wing from June to July. There is one generation per year.

The larvae feed on various low-growing plants, including Ribes rubrum and Galium mollugo.

References

External links

Fauna Europaea
Lepiforum.de
UK Moths

Xanthorhoe
Moths described in 1759
Moths of Asia
Moths of Europe
Taxa named by Carl Alexander Clerck